Rubén Domínguez González (born 23 January 2003) is a Spanish professional basketball player for Estudiantes of the Liga ACB.

Early life and youth career
Domínguez grew up playing basketball for AD Las Canteras in his hometown of Puerto Real. In 2014, he joined the youth academy of Unicaja Málaga. He moved to Baloncesto Torrelodones at age 15.

Professional career
In the 2019–20 season, Domínguez began playing for the reserve team of Estudiantes in the Liga EBA. On 8 November 2020, he made his Liga ACB debut with Estudiantes in a loss against FC Barcelona.

National team career
Domínguez won a silver medal with Spain at the 2018 FIBA U16 European Championship in Serbia, averaging 8.9 points. At the 2019 FIBA U16 European Championship in Italy, he was named most valuable player after averaging 13.4 points, 3.4 rebounds and 2.3 assists per game and leading Spain to a gold medal. Domínguez led his team to fifth place at the 2021 FIBA Under-19 World Cup in Latvia, averaging 18.7 points, 2.9 rebounds and 2.4 assists per game.

References

External links
Liga ACB profile

2003 births
Living people
CB Estudiantes players
People from Puerto Real
Shooting guards
Spanish men's basketball players
Sportspeople from the Province of Cádiz